"Let's Live for Today" is a song written by David "Shel" Shapiro and Italian lyricist Mogol, with additional English lyrics provided by Michael Julien. It was first recorded, with Italian lyrics, under the title of "Piangi con me" (translation: "Cry with Me") by the English band the Rokes in 1966.  Later, when "Piangi con me" was to be released in the United Kingdom, publisher Dick James Music requested that staff writer Julien compose English lyrics for the song.  Julien composed new lyrics, rather than translating from the Italian, and it was his input that transformed "Piangi con me" into "Let's Live for Today".

The song was popularized by the American rock band the Grass Roots, who released it as a single on May 13, 1967.  The Grass Roots' version climbed to number 8 on the Billboard Hot 100 singles chart, eventually selling over two million copies and being awarded a gold disc.  The song also became the title track of the Grass Roots' second album, Let's Live for Today.  Since its initial release, the Grass Roots' rendition of the song has become a staple of oldies radio programming in America and is today widely regarded by critics as a 1960s classic.

History

Early recordings
The song that would become "Let's Live for Today" was originally written by English musician David "Shel" Shapiro and Mogol in 1966, with Italian lyrics and the Italian title of "Piangi con me" (translation: "Cry with Me").  At the time, Shapiro was a member of the Rokes, an English beat group who had relocated to Italy in 1963 and had signed a recording contract with RCA Italiana the following year.  During the mid-1960s, the Rokes became a popular band on the Italian charts, achieving a number of top 20 hits with Italian-language covers of popular British and American songs.  By 1966, however, the band had begun to write their own material, including "Piangi con me", which quickly became their biggest hit to date in Italy. The vocals on the Rokes' original recording were by band drummer Mike Shepstone, rather than Shapiro.

Following its success on the Italian charts, plans were made to release "Piangi con me" in the United Kingdom and as a result, the song was translated into English by Shapiro and given the new title of "Passing Thru Grey".  However, the song's publisher in Britain, Dick James Music, was unhappy with these lyrics and decided that they should be changed.  Michael Julien, a member of the publisher's writing staff, was assigned the task of writing new words for the song and it was his input that transformed it into "Let's Live for Today".  According to writer Andy Morten, the new lyrics "captur[ed] the era's zeitgeist of freedom and hedonism...".  The Rokes' version was released by RCA Victor in April 1967, on the same day that a rival version by London band the Living Daylights was released on the Philips label.  Neither version reached the UK charts.

The Grass Roots' version
In the United States, the Rokes' version of "Let's Live for Today" found its way to the head of Dunhill Records, who felt that the song would make a suitable single release for the Grass Roots.  The composer/producer team of P. F. Sloan and Steve Barri, who managed the Grass Roots' recordings, were also enthusiastic about the song, with Sloan being particularly enamored with the similarities that the song's chorus had to the Drifters' "I Count the Tears".  "Let's Live for Today" was recorded by the Grass Roots, with the help of a number of studio musicians, including Sloan on lead guitar, and was released as a single in May 1967.  The lead vocal on the Grass Roots' recording was sung by the band's bassist Rob Grill and the distinctive "1-2-3-4" count-in before the chorus was sung by guitarist Warren Entner.

The song quickly became popular with the record buying public, selling over two million copies in the U.S. and finally peaking at number 8 on the Billboard Hot 100 during June 1967.  As well as being popular with domestic American audiences, "Let's Live for Today" also found favor with young American men serving overseas in the Vietnam War, as music critic Bruce Eder of the AllMusic website has noted: "Where the single really struck a resonant chord was among men serving in Vietnam; the song's serious emotional content seemed to overlay perfectly with the sense of uncertainty afflicting most of those in combat; parts of the lyric could have echoed sentiments in any number of letters home, words said on last dates, and thoughts directed to deeply missed wives and girlfriends."  Eder also described "Let's Live for Today" by the Grass Roots as "one of the most powerful songs and records to come out of the 1960s."

In addition to its appearance on the Grass Roots' Let's Live for Today album, the song also appears on several of the band's compilations, including Golden Grass, Their 16 Greatest Hits, Anthology: 1965–1975, and All Time Greatest Hits.

Other versions 
Along with the Rokes, the Living Daylights, and the Grass Roots, the song has also been recorded by a number of other bands, including Tempest, the Lords of the New Church, the Slickee Boys, the dB's, and Dreamhouse. Finnish singer Fredi released a Finnish-language version called "Onhan päivä vielä huomennakin" ("There'll still be a day tomorrow", or "Leave it for tomorrow") in 1968. An other Finnish version is by rock band Popeda in 2008 on their album Täydelliset miehet (en: Perfect Men) and also the same year on their single Onhan päivä vielä huomennakin. A version with different English lyrics was released in December 1966 by Dutch band The Skope as "Be mine again". This version reached No. 36 on the Dutch Top 40 chart.

Personnel
Per 1972 reissue album liner notes and the Songfacts website, except when noted.

The Grass Roots
 Rob Grill – lead and backing vocals 
 Warren Entner – co-lead and backing vocals, 12-string acoustic guitar
 Creed Bratton – backing vocals, guitar
 Rick Coonce – backing vocals, possible drums, percussion
Other musicians
 P.F Sloan – lead guitar
Bobby Ray – bass guitar
Hal Blaine – possible drums, percussion

Uses in popular culture 
The Grass Roots' recording of the song appears in the 1997 film Wild America and on the accompanying soundtrack album. A cover version by the Atomics appears in a 2017 TV commercial for H&M. The Grass Roots' version plays over the opening credits of the Pachinko television series.

Chart performance

Weekly charts

Year-end charts

References

External links
 Lyrics of this song
 

1966 songs
1967 singles
The Grass Roots songs
Dreamhouse (band) songs
Folk rock songs
Songs written by Michael Julien
Dunhill Records singles
Number-one singles in South Africa
Songs written by Mogol (lyricist)